Roger D. Lynch is an American businessman and politician serving as a member of the Arkansas House of Representatives from the 14th district. He assumed office in 2017.

Early life and education 
Lynch is a native of Lonoke, Arkansas. He earned a Bachelor of Science degree and Master of Science in operations management from the University of Arkansas.

Career 
From 2001 to 2014, Lynch worked as a plant operations manager at the Remington Outdoor Company. He was elected to the Arkansas House of Representatives in November 2016 and assumed office in January 2017. Since 2014, Lynch has owned and operated Lynch HVACR LLC.

References 

Living people
People from Lonoke, Arkansas
University of Arkansas alumni
Republican Party members of the Arkansas House of Representatives
Year of birth missing (living people)
21st-century American politicians